Jugal Hansraj is an Indian actor, author and filmmaker. 
He started his career as a child actor in Shekhar Kapur's Masoom (1983). He continued his career as a child actor in films like Karma (1986) and Sultanat (1986). He featured as a model for TV and print as a child and appeared in notable ad campaigns. He made his acting debut as an adult in Aa Gale Lag Jaa in 1994. Subsequently, he featured in Mohabbatein (2000), Kabhi Khushi Kabhie Gham (2001) and Salaam Namaste (2005). He served as writer and director for the 2008 computer-animated film Roadside Romeo.

Career
Jugal Hansraj started his career as a child artist in the 1983 film Masoom, which starred Naseeruddin Shah and Shabana Azmi. The film was about a 9-year-old boy whose stepmother was not willing to accept him into the family because he was from 
an extramarital relationship. Masoom was based on Man, Woman and Child, a novel by Erich Segal. The film had a positive response and launched Hansraj's career. Later on, he continued his career as a child actor in films like Karma (1986) and Sultanat (1986). Hansraj was also featured as a model for TV and print as a child. He appeared in notable ad campaigns such as Vicks Vaporub, Saffola and Nutramul.

He started his adult career with Aa Gale Lag Jaa in 1994, where he was paired with Urmila Matondkar, who incidentally played his sister in his first film Masoom. His second film was Papa Kehte Hai in 1995 opposite Mayuri Kango. The 2000 film Mohabbatein, which also featured Shahrukh Khan and Amitabh Bachchan, was his adult breakthrough film. He then played guest roles in Kabhi Khushi Kabhie Gham (2001), Salaam Namaste (2005), Aaja Nachle (2007) and Kahaani 2 (2016).

In 1998, Jugal composed the tune of the title song for his friend Karan Johar’s first film “Kuch Kuch Hota Hai.” Karan confirmed this in his autobiography “An Unsuitable Boy.” The title song became a super hit and went on to become Dharma Productions theme title music.

He served as writer and director for the 2008 computer-animated film Roadside Romeo. Produced jointly by Yash Raj Films and Walt Disney Studios, it featured the voices of Saif Ali Khan, Kareena Kapoor and Javed Jaffrey. It received negative reviews from critics, but won the National Film Award for Best Animated Film. A song sequence from the film was also nominated for the Visual Effects Society Awards in Los Angeles for Best Animated Sequence alongside sequences from WALL-E and Kung Fu Panda.

His second film as a director was the romantic comedy Pyaar Impossible which released in January 2010. This was produced by Yash Raj Films and starred Priyanka Chopra and Uday Chopra.

In 2017, Jugal became a published author with his first novel for children titled "Cross Connection: The Big Circus Adventure". The book was released in December 2017 by Rupa publications India.

Personal life

He is the younger son of cricketer Pravin Hansraj. He has an older brother named Sunil Hansraj.

In July 2014, Hansraj married Jasmine Dhillon, an NRI investment banker from New York. The couple has a son.

Filmography

Films

Television

References

External links 
 
 

1972 births
20th-century Indian male actors
21st-century Indian male actors
Indian male film actors
Male actors in Hindi cinema
Male actors from Mumbai
Living people
Indian male child actors
Sindhi people